Young Joshua is an American Christian hip hop recording artist from Philadelphia, Pennsylvania. Joshua is signed to the Christian hip hop label Cross Movement Records and has released one studio album entitled Thinking Out Loud which reached 23 on the Gospel Billboard Charts in 2010.

Conversion

Young Joshua began writing rap lyrics at the age of 11. However his skills did not improve until he reached the age of 17 years old. He contributed this change in his rap style due to the fact that he changed his spiritual view. He then refocus his craft of music and aim it at Christians and non-Christians who had not yet experience the word on God

Music career

Young Joshua started his career as an independent artist, but in 2010 he signed with Cross Movement Records. To date, Young Joshua has been featured on 50 different Christian albums and has released one studio album.

Discography

Studio albums

References

Living people
American rappers
Musicians from Pennsylvania
Performers of Christian hip hop music
Rappers from Philadelphia
21st-century American rappers
Year of birth missing (living people)